Spencer Susser (born 1977) is an American film director, screenwriter and producer.

Susser is the only American member of the Australian filmmaking collective Blue-Tongue Films. His short film I Love Sarah Jane, featuring Mia Wasikowska, won Best Narrative Short at the 2008 Nashville Film Festival, the Reel Frontier Merit Award at the Arizona International Film Festival, and the Canal+ Award at the Clermont-Ferrand International Short Film Festival. Susser co-wrote the project with David Michôd. In February 2011, it was reported that Susser is developing a feature-length film based on the short.

His feature film debut Hesher stars Joseph Gordon-Levitt and Natalie Portman. It appeared at the 2010 Sundance Film Festival and was released in the United States on May 13, 2011.

Susser co-directed the music video for Lana Del Rey's song "Summertime Sadness" with Kyle Newman.

Filmography

Film

Short films

Camera Department

References

External links 

1977 births
American film directors
American male screenwriters
Living people
Place of birth missing (living people)
Jewish American screenwriters
American music video directors
Advertising directors
21st-century American Jews